Jahvon Michael Henry-Blair (born March 27, 1998) is a Canadian professional basketball player who last played for the Westchester Knicks of the NBA G League. He played college basketball for the Georgetown Hoyas.

High school career
Blair attended St. Edmund Campion Secondary School in Brampton, Ontario before completing his high school career at the Athlete Institute in Mono, Ontario, where he averaged 23.6 points, 6.4 rebounds and 2.7 assists per game. He was named most valuable player of the Jordan Brand Classic International Game and the BioSteel All-Canadian Game. He committed to playing college basketball for Georgetown, becoming the first commitment during the tenure of head coach Patrick Ewing.

College career
As a freshman at Georgetown, Blair averaged nine points and was named to the Big East All-Freshman Team. He declined to 4.1 points per game in his sophomore season. On February 8, 2020, Blair scored a career-high 30 points in a 76–72 win over DePaul. As a junior, he averaged 10.8 points per game. In his senior season, Blair assumed a leading role with the departures of several key players, including Mac McClung. He led the team in scoring with 15.4 points per game and helped lead the Hoyas to the Big East tournament title and Georgetown's first NCAA tournament berth since 2015. After the season, Blair declared for the 2021 NBA draft, forgoing an additional season of eligibility.

Professional career
On August 23, 2021, Blair signed his first professional contract with Lavrio of the Greek Basket League and the Basketball Champions League. On January 16, 2022, he signed with KTP Basket of the Korisliiga.

Westchester Knicks (2022)
On October 23, 2022, Blair joined the Westchester Knicks training camp roster. He was then later waived on November 14, 2022.

National team career
Blair represented Canada at the 2016 FIBA Under-18 Americas Championship. He averaged 6.8 points and helped his team win the silver medal.

Career statistics

College

|-
| style="text-align:left;"| 2017–18
| style="text-align:left;"| Georgetown
| 30 || 2 || 21.5 || .332 || .322 || .857 || 2.2 || 1.7 || .4 || .0 || 9.0
|-
| style="text-align:left;"| 2018–19
| style="text-align:left;"| Georgetown
| 32 || 0 || 12.5 || .350 || .344 || .625 || 1.3 || 1.3 || .2 || .0 || 4.1
|-
| style="text-align:left;"| 2019–20
| style="text-align:left;"| Georgetown
| 31 || 12 || 26.4 || .361 || .326 || .869 || 3.1 || 2.0 || .7 || .0 || 10.8
|-
| style="text-align:left;"| 2020–21
| style="text-align:left;"| Georgetown
| 25 || 17 || 34.7 || .393 || .351 || .849 || 3.6 || 3.6 || .7 || .0 || 15.4
|- class="sortbottom"
| style="text-align:center;" colspan="2"| Career
| 118 || 31 || 23.1 || .363 || .335 || .833 || 2.5 || 2.1 || .5 || .0 || 9.5

References

External links
Georgetown Hoyas bio

1998 births
Living people
Canadian men's basketball players
Sportspeople from Oakville, Ontario
Canadian expatriate basketball people in Greece
Canadian expatriate basketball people in the United States
Georgetown Hoyas men's basketball players
Lavrio B.C. players
Point guards
Shooting guards